John Archibald McDonald (29 May 1882 – 4 June 1961) was an English cricketer who played first-class cricket for Derbyshire in 1905 and 1906.

McDonald  was born in Belper, Derbyshire. He made his debut for Derbyshire during the 1905 season, playing against Nottinghamshire. McDonald scored a career-high score of 21 runs in his debut first-class innings, but the team slipped to a defeat. McDonald played two further first-class matches for Derbyshire during the 1906 season. He was a right-handed batsman and played 6 innings in 3 first-class matches with a top score of 21 and an average of 9.50

McDonald died in Brownhill, Lancashire in 1961, at the age of 79.

External links
John McDonald at Cricket Archive

1882 births
1961 deaths
English cricketers
Derbyshire cricketers
People from Belper
Cricketers from Derbyshire